The West Zone State University (UEZO) is a public university of the State of Rio de Janeiro, legally created in 2002 and inaugurated in 2005.

The university was created with the purpose of meeting the demand of students from the West Zone of Rio de Janeiro, and municipalities such as Itaguaí and Nova Iguaçu, and expanding the technological and economic development of such regions.

References

External links
Official website in Portuguese

Universities and colleges in Rio de Janeiro (city)
2005 establishments in Brazil
Educational institutions established in 2005
State universities in Brazil